Robert Erickson (March 7, 1917 – April 24, 1997) was an American composer.

Education
Erickson was born in Marquette, Michigan. He studied with Ernst Krenek from 1936 to 1947: "I had already studied—and abandoned—the twelve tone system before most other Americans had taken it up." He influenced notable students Morton Subotnick, Pauline Oliveros, Terry Riley, Louise Spizizen, Betty Ann Wong, and Paul Dresher. He is the author of The Structure of Music: A Listener's Guide, which he claimed helped him overcome a "contrapuntal obsession",<ref name="Rich">Erickson, Robert. Quoted in Robert Erickson: Sierra & Other Works (1991 CRI CD 616). Liner notes by Alan Rich, music critic, Los Angeles Daily News.</ref> and Sound Structure in Music (1975), an important early attempt to systematically study timbre in music.

Career
Teaching
He taught at the College of St. Catherine in Saint Paul, Minnesota, San Francisco State College, the University of California, Berkeley, and the San Francisco Conservatory. With composer Will Ogdon, he founded the music department at the University of California, San Diego (UCSD) in 1967: "We decided we wanted a department where composers could feel at home, the way scholars feel at home in other schools." While there he met faculty performers such as bassist Bertram Turetzky, trumpeter Edwin Harkins, flutist Bernhard Batschelet, and singer Carol Plantamura: "I could go to Bert, or Ed, with something I'd written down and ask 'Hey, can you do this?' And I'd get an immediate answer. It was a fabulous time for cross-feeding." He also helped start the San Francisco Tape Music Center. Pauline Oliveros, among others, praises his teaching:

As a composer
Erickson was one of the first American composers to create tape music: "If you get right down to the bottom of what composers do, I think that what composers do now and have always done is to compose their environment in some sense. So I get a special little lift about working with environmental sounds." He also has used invented instruments such as stroking rods, used in Taffy Time, Cardinitas 68, and Roddy (electronic tape composition), tube drums, used in Cradle, Cradle II, and Tube Drum Studies, and the Percussion Loops Console designed with Ron George, used in Percussion Loops.

Many UCSD faculty performers appear on his 1991 CRI release Robert Erickson: Sierra & Other Works (CD 616), playing works written for and with them:Kryl (1977), Harkins, named after the travelling cornet player Bohumir Kryl. The piece from time to time creates a hocket between the singing and playing.Ricercar À 3 (1967), Turetzky. For bass soloist live and on two tape tracks.Postcards (1981), Carol Plantamura and lutenist Jürgen HübscherDunbar's Delight (1985), timpanist Dan Dunbar. Virtuoso solo piece for timpani.Quoq (1978), flutist John Fonville. Named after Finnegans Wake.Sierra (1984), baritone Philip Larson, SONOR Ensemble conducted by Thomas Nee. Commissioned by Thomas Buckner.

He also has an album Pacific Sirens on New World Records.

He wrote Ricercar a 5 for Trombones for Stuart Dempster. The piece uses baroque imitation as well as singing, whistling, fanfares, slides, and other extended techniques.

Recognition and awards
He received several Yaddo fellowships in the fifties and sixties, a Guggenheim Fellowship in 1966, a Ford Foundation fellowship, was elected as a fellow of the Institute for Creative Arts of the University of California in 1968, and his string quartet Solstice won the 1985 Friedham Award for Chamber Music. There are two books about Erickson's life and music: Thinking Sound Music: The Life and Work of Robert Erickson by Charles Shere and Music of Many Means: Sketches and Essays on the Music of Robert Erickson by Robert Erickson and John MacKay.

Illness, death and final works
He suffered from a wasting muscle disease, polymyositis, and was bedridden and in pain for fifteen years before his death; his final work was Music for Trumpet, Strings, and Tympani (1990). He died in San Diego, California, aged 80.

RecordingsAmerican Classics - A Continuum Portrait Vol 9 - Erickson: Recent Impressions, Songs, High Flyer, Summer Music. Naxos 8.559283Robert Erickson: Pacific Sirens. New World Records 80603Robert Erickson: Kryl, Ricercar, Postcards, Dunbars Delight. CRI 616Robert Erickson: Auroras. New World Records 80682Robert Erickson: Complete String Quartets. New World Records 80753Robert Erickson: Duo, Fives, Quintet, Trio. New World Records 80808

Bibliography
 Erickson, Robert. 1975. Sound Structure in Music. Berkeley and Los Angeles: University of California Press. .
 Erickson, Robert. 1988. "Composing Music". Perspectives of New Music 26, no. 2 (Summer): 86–95.
 Erickson, Robert, and John MacKay. 1995. Music of Many Means: Sketches and Essays on the Music of Robert Erickson. Lanham, Maryland: Scarecrow Press. 
 MacKay, John. 1988. "On the Music of Robert Erickson: A Survey and Some Selected Analyses". Perspectives of New Music 26, no. 2 (Summer): 56–85.
 Reynolds, Roger. 1988. "Wonderful Times". Perspectives of New Music 26, no. 2 (Summer): 44–55.
 Shere, Charles. 1995. Thinking Sound Music: The Life and Work of Robert Erickson. Berkeley: Fallen Leaf Press. 
 Shere, Robert. 2001. "Erickson, Robert". The New Grove Dictionary of Music and Musicians, ed. Stanley Sadie and John Tyrrell. London: Macmillan.

References

External links
University of Akron Bierce Library Smith Archives Composer Profile: Robert Erickson
ClassicToday.com Review of Pacific Sirens by Robert Erickson Artistic quality: 8, Sound quality: 9.
Dunbar's Delight Review of Sierra & Other Works by Elliott Schwartz, American Music, Fall, 1998
[
Interview with Robert Erickson, February 27, 1988
Robert Erickson Papers MSS 96. Special Collections & Archives, University of California San Diego Library.

Listening
 two works by the composer: General Speech (1969) and East of the Beach'' (1980)

1917 births
1997 deaths
20th-century classical composers
20th-century American composers
20th-century American male musicians
American classical composers
American male classical composers
Pupils of Ernst Krenek
Pupils of Roger Sessions
University of California, Berkeley faculty
University of California, San Diego faculty